Surendra Nath (1926 – 9 July 1994) was the Governor of Punjab from August 1991 to July 1994. He also held additional charge as the Governor of Himachal Pradesh from November 1993 to July 1994. He was a career Indian Police Service officer. He died in an aeroplane crash in 1994, still in office as governor. His father was Mahashe Rajpal, publisher of Rangila Rasul.

References 

Governors of Punjab, India
Governors of Himachal Pradesh
Indian police officers
1926 births
1994 deaths